Bridgitte Ellen Hartley (born 14 July 1983) is a South African sprint canoer who has competed since the late 2000s. She won a bronze medal in the K-1 1000 m event at the 2009 ICF Canoe Sprint World Championships in Dartmouth. Three years later, at the 2012 Olympic Games in London, Bridgitte again won the bronze medal, this time in the K-1 (Kayak Singles – Women) 500m event. In August 2014, she replicated her Olympic form, and at the ICF Canoe Sprint World Championships in Moscow she picked up a third career bronze model in international competition. Hartley became the first person from both South Africa and the African continent to medal at the ICF Canoe Sprint World Championships. Hartley also competed in the K-2 500 m event at the 2008 Summer Olympics in Beijing, but was eliminated in the semifinals.

Hartley competed at the 2016 Summer Olympics in Rio de Janeiro. In the women's K-1 200 m event, she finished in 13th place. In the women's K-1 500 m event, she finished in 16th place.

In February 2022, she was elected as chair of the International Canoe Federation's (ICF) Athlete Committee.

Early life
Hartley was born in Sandton, a suburb of Johannesburg. Her family moved to Richards Bay in her youth, where she took up surfing. She attended Pretoria High School for Girls where she excelled at sports. After high school, Hartley attended the University of Pretoria.

Affiliations
 TuksSport – University of Pretoria, South Africa

References

External links

1983 births
Canoeists at the 2008 Summer Olympics
Canoeists at the 2012 Summer Olympics
Canoeists at the 2016 Summer Olympics
Living people
Olympic canoeists of South Africa
University of Pretoria alumni
Olympic bronze medalists for South Africa
Olympic medalists in canoeing
ICF Canoe Sprint World Championships medalists in kayak
Medalists at the 2012 Summer Olympics
South African female canoeists
African Games gold medalists for South Africa
African Games medalists in canoeing
People from Sandton
Competitors at the 2011 All-Africa Games
Competitors at the 2019 African Games
Sportspeople from Gauteng
People from Richards Bay